Xiao Chen Tao (小臣妥; died in the 1100s BCE), was a Chinese princess, the daughter of king Wu Ding.  

Wu Ding granted Tao her own personal fief, and elevated her to a ministerial position, xiao chen, by which she is now referred. While her political acts are not very well known, her enfranchisement corroborates the high position of women in Shang China.

References 

12th-century BC births
12th-century BC deaths
12th-century BC Chinese women
12th-century BC Chinese people
Ancient Chinese princesses
Chinese women in politics
Women government ministers of China